Edith Mendel Stern (24 June 1901 – 8 February 1975) was a novelist, book editor, journalist, critic, and writer of books and booklets written as guides on how to cope with problems related to aging, mental illness, and disabled children.

Biography
Born to a Jewish family in New York City, Edith Mendel earned a B.A. from Barnard College in 1922. She was on the editorial staff of Alfred A. Knopf and subsequently on the editorial staffs of several other publishing houses, including Boni & Liveright. She married William A. Stern II, a Justice Department lawyer. After publishing four novels from 1927 to 1935, she wrote books on mental health aimed at a popular audience.

Works

Novels

Nonfiction books and pamphlets
 with Samuel Warren Hamilton, MD:  (5th edition 1968)
 with Mary E. Corcoran: 
 with Howard W. Hopkirk: 
 with Samuel Warren Hamilton, MD: 
 with Elsa Castendyck: 
 with Mabel Ross: ;

References

External links
 Summary of Edith M. Stern papers, 1962–1973, Archives of American Art, Smithsonian Institution

1901 births
1975 deaths
American women novelists
Jewish American novelists
Barnard College alumni
Writers from New York City
20th-century American novelists
20th-century American women writers
Novelists from New York (state)
20th-century American Jews